This is a list of the 6 members of the European Parliament for Cyprus in the 2014 to 2019 session.

List

Party representation

Notes

2014
List
Cyprus